Kári Árnason (born 13 October 1982) is an Icelandic former professional footballer who played last for Icelandic club Víkingur and the Iceland national team. He has previously played for Djurgården, AGF Aarhus, Esbjerg fB, Plymouth Argyle, Aberdeen (two spells), Rotherham United, Malmö FF, Omonia and Gençlerbirliği. Capable of playing in midfield or defence, Kári has represented Iceland at senior level since 2005, making 90 appearances and scoring 6 goals in the process. He represented Iceland at UEFA Euro 2016 and at the 2018 FIFA World Cup.

Club career

Early years
Born in Gothenburg, Kári began his career as a youngster in 1999 with Víkingur at his home town of Reykjavik, where he spent the first five years in his career. Arnason also played for the Gonzaga University Bulldogs in Spokane, Washington from 2002 to 2003. He brought a different style of football to Spokane, the likes of which Bulldog legends Steve Owens and Trevor Conrad had never seen. During a candid interview with Gonzaga Bulletin reporter Ryan McAteer he did admit "Americans though, are in much better shape and can run forever." He also played one season for Adelphi University in 2004. After putting together a string of impressive performances in midfield with Víkingur at an early age in the 2004 season, Kári was signed by Swedish Allsvenskan club Djurgårdens IF in 2004, where he won the Swedish league and cup double in 2005. He was signed by Danish club AGF Aarhus in 2007 and spent two years with the club, along with a spell on loan at fellow Superliga club Esbjerg fB.

Plymouth Argyle
Kári had a trial at English Football League Championship side Plymouth Argyle in the summer of 2009, and after impressing in a couple of friendly matches he signed a one-year contract with the club. He made his debut in August 2009 against Derby County and established himself as a first-team regular at the heart of the club's defence. He scored his first goal for the club against Reading on 28 December 2009 at Home Park, to become the 500th player to score a league goal since the club became professional in 1903. Kári signed a two-year contract extension in January 2010, after a string of consistent performances, to keep him at the club until the summer of 2012.

Aberdeen
Kári joined Heart of Midlothian on trial during their pre-season trip to Italy in June 2011, having been released by Plymouth's administrator after refusing to defer his wages for June. He was not offered a contract by Hearts and then began a trial with fellow Scottish Premier League club Aberdeen. He signed for Aberdeen on 18 July and received international clearance four days later. He made his debut in a 0–0 draw against St Johnstone on 23 July and scored his first goal for Aberdeen on 15 October, the opener in a 3–1 win against Dundee United. In the return New Firm fixture on 2 January 2012, Árnason scored the winning goal from 35-yards at Tannadice. He was offered a new contract in December to extend his stay with the club beyond the 2011–12 season.

His goal against Rangers in a 1–1 draw at Ibrox Stadium took his tally for the campaign to three. Kári rejected Aberdeen's offer of a new contract towards the end of January and manager Craig Brown said that he expected him to leave in the summer. "We made Kári an exceptionally good offer. However, the player believes he can earn a better deal elsewhere," said an Aberdeen spokesperson.

Rotherham United
Kári Árnason joined Rotherham United in June 2012. He played over 100 games for the club, where he earned back-to-back promotions from League Two to the Championship. He played the majority of the games in defense, the others in midfield.

Malmö FF
On 29 June 2015, Kári returned to his country of birth, signing a two-and-a-half-year contract with Malmö FF. Malmö FF sold their two starting centre-backs in the same transfer window, and he formed a new centre-back pairing with Rasmus Bengtsson. The team continued to struggle in their league campaign, but qualified for the 2015–16 UEFA Champions League group stage. In a team with many newly signed players, Kári had quickly become a leader and was appointed vice-captain by Åge Hareide. The team was able to get back to its winning ways during the 2016 season. With captain Markus Rosenberg injured, Kári wore the armband during the final title run and led the team to secure the Allsvenskan title with two games to play.

AC Omonia
On 30 January 2017, Kári joined AC Omonia. He had 8 appearances with the club. He was given a transfer to Aberdeen after expressing his wish for the transfer and an agreement based on the demands of Omonia Nicosia.

Return to Aberdeen
On 14 July 2017, Kári rejoined Aberdeen, for whom he had played in the 2011–12 season. He was released by Aberdeen in May 2018, at the end of his contract.

Gençlerbirliği
On 24 July 2018, Kári agreed terms with Turkish First League side Gençlerbirliği, signing a one-year deal.

Return to Víkingur
At the end of his contract at Gençlerbirliği, Kári rejoined the club he played for as a youth, Víkingur, signing a two-year deal until the end of the 2020 season.

International career

Kári Árnason was called up to the senior Iceland squad in March 2005 for the game against Croatia and he made his debut four days later against Italy. He scored his first goal for his country seven months later in October 2005 against Sweden at Råsunda.

He was selected by Lars Lagerbäck for UEFA Euro 2016 where Iceland made their first ever appearance in a major tournament. In the first game he marked Cristiano Ronaldo out of the game in their draw with Portugal, the team that eventually won the entire tournament. In their last group stage game Iceland were able to beat Austria to advance to the knock-out stages, and he notched an assist and was selected as man of the match. He once again assisted a goal in Iceland's upset victory over England in the round of 16.

In May 2018 he was named in Iceland's 23-man squad for the 2018 World Cup in Russia.

Career statistics

Scores and results list Iceland's goal tally first, score column indicates score after each Kári goal.

Honours
Víkingur FC
Icelandic Cup: 2019, 2021
Icelandic Premier Division: 2021

Malmö FF
Allsvenskan: 2016

Rotherham United
Football League Two runner-up: 2012–13
Football League One play-offs: 2013–14

Djurgården
Allsvenskan: 2005
Svenska Cupen: 2005

References

External links

Danish League Profile 
Malmö FF profile 

1982 births
Living people
Kari Arnason
Kari Arnason
Kari Arnason
Kari Arnason
Djurgårdens IF Fotboll players
Aarhus Gymnastikforening players
Esbjerg fB players
Plymouth Argyle F.C. players
Aberdeen F.C. players
Rotherham United F.C. players
Malmö FF players
AC Omonia players
English Football League players
Danish Superliga players
Scottish Premier League players
Kari Arnason
Expatriate footballers in Cyprus
Expatriate footballers in Sweden
Expatriate footballers in Scotland
Expatriate men's footballers in Denmark
Expatriate footballers in England
Expatriate footballers in Turkey
Association football defenders
Association football midfielders
Kari Arnason
Kari Arnason
Kari Arnason
Kari Arnason
UEFA Euro 2016 players
2018 FIFA World Cup players
Scottish Professional Football League players
Cypriot First Division players
Allsvenskan players
TFF First League players
Kari Arnason